was the 57th emperor of Japan, according to the traditional order of succession.

Yōzei's reign spanned the years from 876 through 884.

Traditional narrative
Before his ascension to the Chrysanthemum Throne, his personal name (his imina) was Sadaakira Shinnō (貞明親王).

Yōzei was the oldest son of Emperor Seiwa.  His mother was the Empress Fujiwara no Takaiko, who was also known after Seiwa's abdication as the Nijō empress.  Yōzei's mother was the sister of Fujiwara no Mototsune, who would figure prominently in the young emperor's life.

In ancient Japan, there were four noble clans, the Gempeitōkitsu (源平藤橘).  One of these clans, the Minamoto clan (源氏) are also known as Genji, and of these, the Yōzei Genji (陽成源氏) are descended from the 57th emperor Yōzei.

Yōzei had nine Imperial children, born after he had abdicated.

He is said to have suffered from mental instability after acceding to his position at a tender young age. He concentrated on waka during his later years. His famous waka expressed his growing love by superimposing the image of the flow of the river.

Events of Yōzei's life
Yōzei was made emperor when he was an immature, unformed young boy.

 869 (Jōgan 10): Yōzei was born, and he is named Seiwa's heir in the following year.
 18 December 876 (Jōgan 18, 29th day of the 11th month): In the 18th year of Emperor Seiwa's reign (清和天皇十八年), he ceded his throne to his son, which meant that the young child received the succession (senso).  Shortly thereafter, Emperor Yōzei formally acceded to the throne (sokui).
 20 January 877 (Gangyō 1, 3rd day of the 1st month): Yōzei was formally enthroned at age 8; and the beginning of a new nengō was proclaimed.  However, the new residence being constructed for the emperor had not been completed; and initially, he must live elsewhere in the palace compound.
 877 (Gangyō 1, 2nd month): Ambassadors from Baekje arrived in the province of Izumo; but they were turned back.
 877 (Gangyō 1, 6th month): There was a great drought; and sacrifices were made at the temples of Hachiman, Kamo and other temples in Ise Province.  Eventually, it rained.
 883 (Gangyō 7, 1st month): In his early teens, Yōzei often spent time alone; and sometimes he would feed live frogs to snakes so that he could watch the reptile swallowing; or sometimes, he would find pleasure in setting dogs and monkeys to fight.  In time, these amusements became more dangerous.  He himself executed criminals.  When he became angry, he sometimes chased after those who dared speak up; and he sometimes tried to use his sword.  Fujiwara no Mototsune, the Kanpaku, used every possible opportunity to turn Yōzei towards more seemly conduct, but the emperor closed his ears to all remonstrances.
 884 (Gangyō 8, 1st month): The extravagant and dangerous habits of the emperor continued unabated.  At one point, Mototsune came to the court and discovered that Yōzei had arranged a bizarre scenario for his diversion:  He ordered some men to climb high into trees, and then he ordered others to use sharp lances to poke at these men in trees until they fell to their deaths.  This extraordinary event convinced Mototsune that the emperor was too "undignified" to reign.  Mototsune reluctantly realized that someone needed to devise a strategy for deposing the emperor.  Shortly thereafter, Mototsune approached Yōzei and remarked that it must be boring to be so often alone, and then Mototsune suggested that the emperor might be amused by a horse race.  Yōzei was attracted to this proposition, and he eagerly encouraged Mototsune to set a time and place for the event.  It was decided that this special amusement for the emperor would take place on the 4th day of the 2nd month of Gangyō 8.
 4 March 884 (Gangyō 8, 4th day of the 2nd month): The pretext of a special horse race enticed the emperor to leave his palace.  Yōzei traveled in a carriage which was quickly surrounded by a heavy guard.  The carriage was redirected to Yo seí in palace (Yang tchhing yuan) at Ni zio, a town situated a short distance to the south-west of Miyako.  Mototsune confronted the emperor, explaining that his demented behavior made him incapable of reigning, and that he was being dethroned.  At this news, Yōzei cried sincerely, which did attract feelings of compassion from those who witnessed his contrition.

According to very scanty information from the Imperial archives, including sources such as Rikkokushi, and Nihon Sandai Jitsuroku, Emperor Yōzei murdered one of his retainers, an action that caused massive scandal in the Heian court. Japanese society during the Heian era was very sensitive to issues of "pollution," both spiritual and personal.  Deaths (especially killing animals or people) were the worst acts of pollution possible, and warranted days of seclusion in order to purify oneself. Since the Emperor was seen as a divine figure and linked to the deities, pollution of such extreme degree committed by the highest source was seen as extremely ruinous. Many of the high court officials construed Emperor Yōzei's actions as exceeding the bounds of acceptable behavior, and as justifiable cause for the emperor to be forcibly deposed.

In Kitabatake Chikafusa's 14th-century account of Emperor Yōzei's reign, the emperor is described as possessing a "violent disposition" and unfit to be a ruler. In the end, when Fujiwara no Mototsune, who was Sesshō (regent for the child-emperor, 876–880), Kampaku (chief advisor or first secretary for the emperor, 880–890), and Daijō Daijin (Great Minister of the Council of State), decided that Yōzei should be removed from the throne, he discovered that there was general agreement amongst the kuge that this was a correct and necessary decision.

Yōzei was succeeded by his father's uncle, Emperor Kōkō; and in the reign of Kōkō's son, Emperor Uda, the madness re-visited the tormented former emperor:

 889 (Kanpyō 1, 10th month): The former emperor Yōzei was newly attacked by the mental illness. Yōzei would enter the palace and address courtiers he would meet with the greatest rudeness. He became increasingly furious. He garroted women with the strings of musical instruments and then threw the bodies into a lake.  While riding on horseback, he directed his mount to run over people.  Sometimes he simply disappeared into the mountains where he chased wild boars and Sika deer, which in Shinto cosmology, were considered to be messengers of the kami.

Yōzei lived in retirement until the age of 80.

The actual site of Yōzei's grave is known.  This emperor is traditionally venerated at a memorial Shinto shrine (misasagi) at Kyoto.

The Imperial Household Agency designates this location as Yōzei's mausoleum.  It is formally named Kaguragaoka no Higashi no misasagi.

Kugyō
 is a collective term for the very few most powerful men attached to the court of the Emperor of Japan in pre-Meiji eras.

In general, this elite group included only three to four men at a time.  These were hereditary courtiers whose experience and background would have brought them to the pinnacle of a life's career. During Yozei's reign, this apex of the Daijō-kan included:
 Sesshō, Fujiwara no Mototsune (藤原基経), 836–891.
 Kampaku, Fujiwara no Mototsune (藤原基経).
 Daijō-daijin, Fujiwara no Mototsune.
 Sadaijin, Minamoto no Tōru (源融).
 Udaijin, Fujiwara no Mototsune.
 Udaijin, Minamoto no Masaru (源多).
 Naidaijin (not appointed)
 Dainagon, Minamoto no Masaru (源多).
 Dainagon, Minafuchi no Toshina (南淵年名), 807–877

Eras of Yōzei's reign
The years of Yōzei's reign are more specifically identified by more than one era name or nengō.   During this time, the tradition of naming eras because of good omens changed.  Instead, the name of an era might be chosen to limit the effects of something bad.
 Jōgan    (859–877)
 Gangyō  (877–885)

Consorts and children
Consort (Hi): Imperial Princess Kanshin (簡子内親王) (d. 914), Emperor Kōkō's second daughter

Consort (Hi): Imperial Princess Yasuko (綏子内親王) (d. 925), Emperor Kōkō's third daughter

Consort (Hi): Princess Kyoko (姣子女王; d. 914), Imperial Prince Koretada's daughter
Imperial Prince Motonaga (元長親王; 901–976)
Fourth Son: Imperial Prince Mototoshi (元利親王; d. 964)
Imperial Princess Chōshi (長子内親王; d. 922)
Imperial Princess Genshi (儼子内親王; d. 930)

Court lady: Fujiwara no Tōnaga's daughter
Second Son: Imperial Prince Motoyoshi (元良親王)
Imperial Prince Motohira (元平親王; d. 958)

Court lady: daughter of Ki clan
First son: Minamoto no Kiyokage (源清蔭; 884–950), Dainagon 948–950

Court lady: Tomo Yasuhira's daughter
Minamoto no Kiyomi (源清鑒; d. 936)

Court lady: daughter of Saeki clan
Minamoto no Kiyotō (源清遠; d. 912)

Ancestry

Notes

References
 Brown, Delmer M. and Ichirō Ishida, eds. (1979).  Gukanshō: The Future and the Past. Berkeley: University of California Press. ; 
 Ponsonby-Fane, Richard Arthur Brabazon. (1959).  The Imperial House of Japan. Kyoto: Ponsonby Memorial Society. 
 Titsingh, Isaac. (1834). Nihon Ōdai Ichiran; ou,  Annales des empereurs du Japon.  Paris: Royal Asiatic Society, Oriental Translation Fund of Great Britain and Ireland. 
 Varley, H. Paul. (1980).  Jinnō Shōtōki: A Chronicle of Gods and Sovereigns. New York: Columbia University Press. ;

See also
 Emperor of Japan
 List of Emperors of Japan
 Imperial cult
 Deer (mythology)
 Emperor Go-Yōzei

 
 

Japanese emperors
869 births
949 deaths
9th-century rulers in Asia
9th-century Japanese monarchs
10th-century Japanese people
Hyakunin Isshu poets
Dethroned monarchs
Japanese retired emperors
Child monarchs from Asia
Monarchs deposed as children
People from Kyoto